The 2022–23 Blackwater Bossing season was the eighth season of the franchise in the Philippine Basketball Association (PBA).

Key dates
May 15: The PBA Season 47 draft was held at the Robinsons Place Manila in Manila.

Draft picks

Roster

Philippine Cup

Eliminations

Standings

Game log

|-bgcolor=ccffcc
| 1
| June 9
| TNT
| W 85–78
| JVee Casio (22)
| Yousef Taha (12)
| Yousef Taha (5)
| Ynares Center
| 1–0
|-bgcolor=ffcccc
| 2
| June 12
| Barangay Ginebra
| L 82–85
| Rey Suerte (15)
| Yousef Taha (13)
| Baser Amer (4)
| Ynares Center
| 1–1
|-bgcolor=ccffcc
| 3
| June 18
| NorthPort
| W 97–90
| JVee Casio (22)
| McCarthy, Taha (7)
| Rashawn McCarthy (10)
| Ynares Center
| 2–1
|-bgcolor=ccffcc
| 4
| June 25
| Terrafirma
| W 107–70
| Ato Ular (16)
| Yousef Taha (14)
| Amer, Melton (5)
| Ynares Center
| 3–1
|-bgcolor=ccffcc
| 5
| June 30
| Meralco
| W 90–89
| Casio, Ular (19)
| Ato Ular (15)
| Rashawn McCarthy (7)
| Smart Araneta Coliseum
| 4–1

|-bgcolor=ccffcc
| 6
| July 8
| Phoenix
| W 91–89
| Ato Ular (34)
| Ato Ular (10)
| Yousef Taha (7)
| Smart Araneta Coliseum
| 5–1
|-bgcolor=ffcccc
| 7
| July 10
| San Miguel
| L 107–110 (OT)
| Rashawn McCarthy (22)
| Ato Ular (8)
| Amer, Melton (5)
| Smart Araneta Coliseum10,308
| 5–2
|-bgcolor=ffcccc
| 8
| July 13
| Rain or Shine
| L 90–107
| Brandon Ganuelas-Rosser (19)
| Ato Ular (9)
| Casio, McCarthy (5)
| Smart Araneta Coliseum
| 5–3
|-bgcolor=ffcccc
| 9
| July 15
| NLEX
| L 68–98
| Yousef Taha (9)
| Ato Ular (11)
| Ayonayon, Melton (4)
| Ynares Center
| 5–4
|-bgcolor=ffcccc
| 10
| July 20
| Converge
| L 90–92
| Brandon Ganuelas-Rosser (20)
| Brandon Ganuelas-Rosser (12)
| Amer, Casio, Eboña (3)
| Smart Araneta Coliseum
| 5–5
|-bgcolor=ffcccc
| 11
| July 22
| Magnolia
| L 66–75
| Brandon Ganuelas-Rosser (12)
| Ganuelas-Rosser, Ular (7)
| JVee Casio (6)
| Smart Araneta Coliseum
| 5–6

Playoffs

Bracket

Game log

|-bgcolor=ffcccc
| 1
| July 27
| San Miguel
| L 93–123
| Ato Ular (15)
| Ato Ular (11)
| Baser Amer (5)
| Smart Araneta Coliseum
| 0–1

Commissioner's Cup

Eliminations

Standings

Game log

|-bgcolor=ffcccc
| 1
| September 21, 2022
| Bay Area
| L 87–133
| Ato Ular (13)
| Ato Ular (14)
| Cameron Krutwig (8)
| SM Mall of Asia Arena
| 0–1
|-bgcolor=ccffcc
| 2
| September 24, 2022
| Phoenix
| W 97–85
| Baser Amer (24)
| Cameron Krutwig (16)
| Cameron Krutwig (7)
| SM Mall of Asia Arena
| 1–1
|-bgcolor=ffcccc
| 3
| September 30, 2022
| NLEX
| L 102–105
| Baser Amer (26)
| Cameron Krutwig (14)
| Cameron Krutwig (8)
| Smart Araneta Coliseum
| 1–2

|-bgcolor=ccffcc
| 4
| October 5, 2022
| San Miguel
| W 109–106
| Cameron Krutwig (20)
| Cameron Krutwig (18)
| Cameron Krutwig (10)
| Smart Araneta Coliseum
| 2–2
|-bgcolor=ffcccc
| 5
| October 12, 2022
| NorthPort
| L 83–87
| Cameron Krutwig (28)
| Cameron Krutwig (17)
| Banal, Krutwig (4)
| Smart Araneta Coliseum
| 2–3
|-bgcolor=ccffcc
| 6
| October 14, 2022
| Terrafirma
| W 93–86
| Cameron Krutwig (29)
| Cameron Krutwig (24)
| Amer, McCarthy (4)
| Smart Araneta Coliseum
| 3–3
|-bgcolor=ffcccc
| 7
| October 22, 2022
| TNT
| L 98–108
| Cameron Krutwig (25)
| Ato Ular (13)
| Ato Ular (6)
| PhilSports Arena
| 3–4
|-bgcolor=ffcccc
| 8
| October 30, 2022
| Converge
| L 71–77
| Cameron Krutwig (16)
| Cameron Krutwig (15)
| Cameron Krutwig (4)
| Ynares Center
| 3–5

|-bgcolor=ffcccc
| 9
| November 6, 2022
| Magnolia
| L 69–91
| Ato Ular (14)
| Cameron Krutwig (16)
| Cameron Krutwig (4)
| Smart Araneta Coliseum10,149
| 3–6
|-bgcolor=ffcccc
| 10
| November 11, 2022
| Meralco
| L 98–102 (OT)
| Cameron Krutwig (23)
| Cameron Krutwig (19)
| Cameron Krutwig (6)
| Ynares Center
| 3–7
|-bgcolor=ffcccc
| 11
| November 18, 2022
| Barangay Ginebra
| L 84–98
| Ato Ular (20)
| Cameron Krutwig (15)
| Cameron Krutwig (6)
| Smart Araneta Coliseum
| 3–8
|-bgcolor=ffcccc
| 12
| November 25, 2022
| Rain or Shine
| L 97–116
| Cameron Krutwig (23)
| Cameron Krutwig (17)
| Cameron Krutwig (4)
| PhilSports Arena
| 3–9

Governors' Cup

Eliminations

Standings

Game log

|-bgcolor=ffcccc
| 1
| January 25
| NLEX
| L 102–124
| Shawn Glover (26)
| Ato Ular (11)
| Rashawn McCarthy (10)
| Smart Araneta Coliseum
| 0–1
|-bgcolor=ccffcc
| 2
| January 27
| Phoenix
| W 108–105
| Shawn Glover (31)
| Glover, Taha (13)
| Rashawn McCarthy (7)
| Ynares Center
| 1–1

|-bgcolor=ffcccc
| 3
| February 1
| San Miguel
| L 86–105
| Shawn Glover (16)
| Shawn Glover (12)
| RK Ilagan (6)
| PhilSports Arena
| 1–2
|-bgcolor=ffcccc
| 4
| February 4
| Meralco
| L 99–125
| Shawn Glover (20)
| Glover, Ilagan (7)
| Rashawn McCarthy (8)
| Ynares Center
| 1–3
|-bgcolor=ffcccc
| 5
| February 9
| Terrafirma
| L 106–119
| Troy Williams (55)
| Troy Williams (14)
| Troy Williams (5)
| Smart Araneta Coliseum
| 1–4
|-bgcolor=ffcccc
| 6
| February 12
| Rain or Shine
| L 117–122
| Troy Williams (40)
| Ular, Williams (13)
| Baser Amer (7)
| SM Mall of Asia Arena11,212
| 1–5
|-bgcolor=ffcccc
| 7
| February 15
| TNT
| L 116–138
| Troy Williams (22)
| Taha, Williams (8)
| Troy Williams (6)
| SM Mall of Asia Arena
| 1–6
|-bgcolor=ffcccc
| 8
| February 19
| Barangay Ginebra
| L 93–119 
| Shawn Glover (14)
| Glover, Ular (10)
| Glover, Ilagan, McCarthy (3)
| PhilSports Arena
| 1–7
|-bgcolor=ffcccc
| 9
| February 23
| Converge
| L 90–98 
| Troy Rosario (20)
| Shawn Glover (10)
| Shawn Glover (5)
| PhilSports Arena
| 1–8
|-bgcolor=ffcccc
| 10
| February 25
| NorthPort
| L 104–110
| Shawn Glover (20)
| Shawn Glover (9)
| RK Ilagan (7)
| Smart Araneta Coliseum
| 1–9

|-bgcolor=ffcccc
| 11
| March 8
| Magnolia
| L 95–110 
| Shawn Glover (22) 
| Ato Ular (10)
| JVee Casio (10)
| Ynares Center
| 1–10

Transactions

Free agency

Signings

Trades

Pre-season

Mid-season

Commissioner's Cup

Recruited imports

References

Blackwater Bossing seasons
Blackwater Bossing